Best Ogedegbe (3 September 1954 – 28 September 2009) was a Nigerian football goalkeeper.

Career
He played with Shooting Stars F.C. most of his career, and was the goalkeeper when Shooting Stars won Nigeria's first continental trophy, the African Cup Winners Cup in 1976.

International career
Ogedegbe played for the Nigeria national football team (then known as the "Green Eagles")  when they won the 1980 African Cup of Nations. He also represented Nigeria at the 1980 Summer Olympics in Moscow.

Coaching career
Ogedegbe was an assistant coach during the 2008–09 season for the Dolphins F.C. He was also a former assistant with Wikki Tourists and the 2008 Summer Olympics silver medalist team.

Death
He died, aged 55 at the University College Hospital in Ibadan on 28 September 2009. He had undergone eye surgery the previous week, but had lapsed into a coma following complications from the operation.

References

External links
FIFA player Statistics
My worst moment in Eagles – Ogedegbe
Green Eagles goalkeeper, Ogedegbe dies at 55

1954 births
2009 deaths
Africa Cup of Nations-winning players
Nigerian footballers
Olympic footballers of Nigeria
Footballers at the 1980 Summer Olympics
1980 African Cup of Nations players
1982 African Cup of Nations players
Nigeria international footballers
Nigerian football managers
Shooting Stars S.C. players
Association football goalkeepers
Dolphin F.C. (Nigeria) managers
Yoruba sportspeople
Sportspeople from Lagos
African Games silver medalists for Nigeria
African Games medalists in football
Competitors at the 1978 All-Africa Games